Power Rangers Zeo is a television series and the fourth season of the Power Rangers franchise, based on the 19th Super Sentai series Chouriki Sentai Ohranger. It is the continuation of Mighty Morphin Power Rangers, which aired in 1996.

Power Rangers Zeo is the first season of Power Rangers to follow the Super Sentai practice of annual Ranger suit changes.

Plot
After witnessing the destruction of the Command Center, the powerless Rangers discover the Zeo Crystal intact in the rubble—apparently dropped by Goldar and Rito Revolto. The Crystal guides them to a portal, which takes them deep underground to the Power Chamber where they find Zordon and Alpha 5 waiting for them. The Mighty Morphin Power Rangers become the Zeo Rangers, a new team of Rangers powered by the Zeo Crystal. The four remaining Mighty Morphin Power Rangers, Tommy Oliver, Adam Park, Rocky DeSantos and Katherine Hillard become Zeo Ranger V — Red, Zeo Ranger IV — Green, Zeo Ranger III — Blue and Zeo Ranger I — Pink respectively and Tanya Sloan joins the team as Zeo Ranger II — Yellow, while Billy Cranston chooses to become their technical advisor rather than continuing as a Ranger.

The Machine Empire, led by King Mondo and Queen Machina, enters Earth's solar system, seeking to conquer Earth, with the Zeo Rangers serving as the only opposition. Many, even Rita Repulsa and Lord Zedd, are forced to flee to the M51 Galaxy under the threat of destruction. Unbeknownst to anyone, Rito and Goldar – now amnesiac – are left behind on Earth. They are taken in by Bulk and Skull, who have them serve as butlers. Meanwhile, Bulk and Skull continue to be members of the Junior Police Force until Lt. Jerome Stone is dismissed, when Bulk tries winning the heart of the chief's daughter. Quitting as a show of respect for Stone, they join him at his new detective agency.

Over time, the Machine Empire wears down the five Zeo Rangers, but they are rescued by the mysterious Gold Ranger. Though his identity is unknown, it quickly becomes clear he is there to help the Rangers. After he is injured in battle, it is revealed that the mysterious Gold Ranger is an alien, Trey of Triforia. Split into three separate selves, Trey is forced to temporarily pass his powers to a worthy warrior while healing. They attempt to transfer Trey's powers to Billy, but as Billy acquired excess negative energy during the Command Center's destruction, he is unable to do so. The ultimate successor is Jason Lee Scott, the original Red Power Ranger and team leader. This event also sees the introduction of the more powerful Super Zeo Zords, which were used against a tougher generation of machines. The Super Zeo Megazord is powerful enough to later destroy King Mondo, creating a power vacuum in the Machine Empire.

Secretly returning from the M51 Galaxy, Lord Zedd and Rita seek to become top villains again. Operating out of an RV with Finster, they restore Goldar and Rito's memories, retrieving the pair in the process. After King Mondo's death, they launch their first plan, to use Louie Kaboom to take over the Machine Empire. Though he succeeds, he breaks free of Zedd and Rita's control. He embarks on his own plans to conquer Earth and destroy the Zeo Rangers. Louie is eventually killed by King Mondo's first-born son Prince Gasket and his wife Princess Archerina, who rule until King Mondo's reconstruction is complete, which causes them to flee.

When Billy begins rapidly aging as a side-effect of restoring his proper age before undoing Master Vile's spell in the last series, the Zeo and Aquitian Rangers race to help him and fend off monsters from King Mondo as well as Zedd and Rita. Billy leaves Earth for treatment on Aquitar and chooses to stay to be with Cestria. Soon after, it is discovered the Gold Ranger powers are leaving Jason and draining his life force in the process as the alien powers were not meant for a human. Trey is still in recovery, but a risky gamble with the Zeo Crystal heals him, restoring his powers. Rita and Lord Zedd finally get revenge on the Machine Empire by crippling their leaders with a bomb.

Characters

Zeo Rangers

 Tommy Oliver He is Zeo Ranger V - Red and was previously the Green Ranger, the White Ranger, and the White Ninja Ranger. He found his Zeo Crystal in the American Southwest. He is the leader of the Zeo Rangers. Tommy wears a red suit with a star-shaped visor on his helmet. He piloted Zeo Zord 5, Super Zeo Zord 5, and the Red Battlezord. His primary weapon was the Zeo Power Sword. He is portrayed by Jason David Frank.
 Adam Park He is Zeo Ranger IV - Green and was previously the second Black Ranger, and Black Ninja Ranger. He found his Zeo Crystal in Korea. Adam wears a green suit with a rectangular visor. He piloted Zeo Zord Four and Super Zeo Four. His primary weapon was the Zeo Power Hatchets. He is portrayed by Johnny Yong Bosch.
 Rocky DeSantosHe is Zeo Ranger III - Blue and was previously the second Red Ranger, and Red Ninja Ranger. He found his Zeo Crystal in Mexico. Rocky wore a blue suit with a triangular visor on his helmet. He piloted Zeo Zord Three and Super Zeo Three. His primary weapon was the Zeo Power Axes. He is portrayed by Steve Cardenas.
 Tanya Sloan She is Zeo Ranger II - Yellow and the only new member of the core group. When Aisha, the former Yellow Ranger, went for her Zeo Crystal in Africa, she decided that she wanted to help the animals who were sick; so she sent Tanya back with the Zeo Crystal in her place. Initially returning as a child, the Zeo Crystal made Tanya the same age as the other Rangers, which she gradually got used to. Tanya wears a yellow suit with two horizontal lines for a visor on her helmet. She piloted Zeo Zord Two and Super Zeo Two. Her primary weapon was the Zeo Power Clubs. She is portrayed by Nakia Burrise.
 Katherine "Kat" HillardShe is Zeo Ranger I - Pink and was previously the second Pink Ranger, and second Pink Ninja Ranger. She found her Zeo Crystal in her homeland of Australia. She is also Tommy Oliver's love interest. Katherine wears a pink suit with a circular visor on her helmet. She piloted Zeo Zord One and Super Zeo One. Her primary weapon was the Zeo Power Shield. She is portrayed by Catherine Sutherland.
 Trey of Triforia The original Gold Ranger and also the prince of planet Triforia, a place where everyone had identical triplets. He gave the Zeo Rangers their Super Zeo Zords when he had to return for his planet. Trey of Triforia wears a black suit with a golden vest and had a visor shaped like the kanji for "king". He piloted Pyramidas and his primary weapon was the Golden Power Staff. He is portrayed by Ted, Tim, and Tom DiFilippo and voiced by Brad Hawkins in his first appearances.
 Jason Lee Scott The second Gold Ranger and previously the original Red Ranger. When Trey of Triforia had to return to his planet, Tommy went and found Jason to take the place of the Gold Ranger while he was gone. He piloted Pyramidas and his primary weapon was the Golden Power Staff. He is portrayed by Austin St. John.

Supporting characters
 Zordon The Zeo Rangers' mentor. Zordon serves as a source of vast wisdom and knowledge for the team. He is voiced by Robert L. Manahan.
 Alpha 5 Zordon's robotic assistant, in charge of keeping the Power Chamber working. He is voiced by Richard Steven Horvitz (credited as Richard Wood).
 Billy Cranston The former Blue Mighty Morphin Power Ranger and Blue Ninja Ranger, Billy has retired from being a Power Ranger, electing to instead assist Alpha. He is portrayed by David Yost.
 Alien Rangers Rangers from the planet Aquitar, who helped protect Earth from Zedd and Rita during the events of the previous mini-series. They seek Billy's technological expertise at one point to help defeat new foes, and teach him about their own technology in return; thus creating the Red Battlezord.
 Emily A waitress at Ernie's Beach Club and a love interest to Jason. She is portrayed by Lesley Tesh-Pedersen.
 Ernie The owner of the Angel Grove Youth Center and juice bar. He is portrayed by Richard Genelle.
 Farkus "Bulk" Bulkmeier A former bully, he is first a junior police officer and then a private detective. He is portrayed by Paul Schrier.
 Eugene "Skull" Skullovitch A former bully, he is first a junior police officer and then a private detective. He is portrayed by Jason Narvy.
 Lt./Det. Jerome B. Stone Jerome is a police lieutenant who is the supervisor of Bulk and Skull. After Bulk had a crush on his superior's daughter, he was fired. Jerome later became a private investigator with Bulk and Skull still working under him. He is portrayed by Gregg Bullock.
 David Truehart Tommy's brother, who was adopted by the same Native American (Sam Truehart) Tommy met while retrieving his piece of the Zeo crystal. He is portrayed by Jason David Frank's real-life brother Eric Frank.
CestriaShe serves as Billy Cranston's love interest.
Auric the Conqueror An ancient tiki that had been dormant on the tropical Mysterio Island for years. He is voiced by Derek Stephen Prince (uncredited).
 Tritor A part-lizard alien who Bulk and Skull befriend when they are prisoners in the Machine Arena in "A King for a Day Parts 1 & 2". He is portrayed by Koichi Sakamoto and voiced by Paul St. Peter (both uncredited).

Villains

Machine Empire
 King Mondo The ruler of the Machine Empire. He is voiced by David Stenstrom.
 Queen Machina The queen of the Machine Empire. She is voiced by Alex Borstein.
 Prince Sprocket The son of King Mondo and Queen Machina. He is voiced by Barbara Goodson.
 Klank A robot that is loyal to King Mondo and Queen Machina. He is voiced by Oliver Page.
 Orbus A floating module that is paired with Klank. When swung around by Klank, Orbus will make the monster grow. He is voiced by Barbara Goodson.
 Louie Kaboom A missile-themed robot that was originally used by Lord Zedd and Rita Repulsa to take control of the Machine Empire following King Mondo's apparent destruction only for Goldar and Rito to lose the remote control. He can transform into his missile form. When Prince Gasket and Archerina came, Louie was enchanted by Archerina and destroyed by the Super Zeo Ultrazord. He is voiced by Lex Lang (uncredited).
 Prince Gasket Disowned older son of King Mondo and Queen Machina.
 Princess Archerina The daughter of King Aradon who eloped with Prince Gasket. She is voiced by Melora Harte (uncredited).
 Cogs The Machine Empire's foot soldiers. They pilot octopus-shaped jets called Quadrafighters and are able to blast lasers out of their eyes.

Machine Empire Monsters
The monsters of this show are robots created by the Machine Empire. They are adapted from the monsters featured in Chouriki Sentai Ohranger. To make a monster grow, Klank would swing Orbus around until he latched onto the monster emitting an energy that would enlarge the monster.

 Staroid (voiced by Derek Stephen Prince) – A starfish-themed robot monster used by the Machine Empire. It was destroyed by the Zeo Megazord.
 Silo (voiced by Bob Papenbrook in the first appearance, Kirk Thornton in the second appearance) – A robotic rocket monster used by the Machine Empire after the Cogs created it from some spare parts. He was destroyed by the Zeo Megazord. Silo was later rebuilt and equipped with the Neo-Plutonium Armor which gave the Rangers a hard time. When he and the other Neo-Plutonium Armor-enhanced monsters were unleashed and enlarged, Billy reveals his analysis on the monsters where their upgraded state would make quick work of the Zeo Zords. Trey of Triforia was able to arrange for them to gain the Super Zeo Zords to fight Silo and the other monsters. Silo was destroyed by Super Zeo Zord 5.
 Boohoo the Clown (voiced by Michael Sorich) – A robotic baby-themed clown monster used by the Machine Empire. Boohoo can emit a high frequency sound waves extremely painful to the human ear. It was destroyed by the Zeo Megazord.
 People Pitcher (voiced by Ari Ross) – A robotic pitching machine/vacuum cleaner monster used by the Machine Empire. He shoots balls that trap anyone who hits them within his body. It was destroyed by the Zeo Megazord.
 Digster (voiced by Derek Stephen Prince) – Digster is a robotic excavator monster used by the Machine Empire that was operated by levers pulled by the small mechanoid pilot on top of his head. It was destroyed by the Zeo Megazord.
 Puppetman (voiced by Paul Pistore) – A robotic puppet from the "Captain Pete" show brought to life by the Machine Empire when the Cogs planted a transmitter on its backside. He hypnotized kids to be under his control. He was destroyed by the Zeo Megazord. The Puppetman puppet was later rebuilt without the transmitter and returned to Captain Pete.
 Leaky Faucet (voiced by Ezra Weisz) – A robotic faucet monster used by the Machine Empire after its costume was stolen from the set of "The Invasion of Blueface". The second version was used to pollute the water through the pipes and was destroyed by the Zeo Ultrazord. The first Leaky Faucet wore a yellow hard hat while the second Leaky Faucet wore a blue one.
 Pumpkin Sorcerer – A robotic Jack-o'-lantern-themed witch monster used by the Machine Empire after its costume was stolen from the set of "The Invasion of Blueface".
 Steambot – A robotic shower monster used by the Machine Empire after its costume was stolen from the set of "The Invasion of Blueface".
 Traffic Kitty – A robotic cat-eared traffic signal monster used by the Machine Empire after its costume was stolen from the set of "The Invasion of Blueface".
 Bucket of Bolts (voiced by Richard Epcar) – A robotic train monster used by the Machine Empire after its costume was stolen from the set of "The Invasion of Blueface". Its eye was a fusion of Leaky Faucet, Pumpkin Sorcerer, Steambot, and Traffic Kitty. In giant form, he turns himself into a train. It was destroyed by the Zeo Megazord when it destroyed the tracks it was on.
 Video Vulture (voiced by Dave Mallow) – A robot vulture with a video camera for a head. Video Vulture transported the Rangers to Prince Sprocket's movie dimension. It was later used by Prince Gasket in the Machine Arena.
 Hydro-Contaminators (voiced by Dan Woren) – The Hydro-Contaminators are robotic land mine-shaped beings that attacked Aquitar and poisoned its waters. One Hydro-Contaminator followed Cestro to Earth and begun its plan to pollute Earth's waters. It was destroyed by the Zeo Blaster. The rest of its people had made peace with the Aquitarians.
 Adrian and Pollenator (voiced by Brian Tahash and Kirk Thornton) – Adrian and Pollenator are robotic cactus monsters created by King Mondo from Rocky's plants. They retained the bizarre hunger for metal from their plant form. Pollenator was destroyed by the Advanced Zeo Laser Pistols while Adrian's destruction was not seen.
 Fortissimodo (voiced by Scott Page-Pagter) – A robotic piano monster used by the Machine Empire to capture the "mysterious piano player" who turned out to be Skull. It was destroyed by the Zeo Megazord.
 Mean Screen (voiced by Karim Prince) – A robotic bird-faced computer monster used by the Machine Empire. He is capable of absorbing the information on all of the Power Rangers' weapons and even the Zords as well as causing technical malfunctions throughout Angel Grove. His screen was his main source of power. It was destroyed by the Zeo Megazord.
 Mechanizer (voiced by Eddie Frierson) – A robotic piranha-faced tank/parasite monster used by the Machine Empire. Mondo sent Klank to set up an ambush and to destroy the Angel Grove University warehouse if the Rangers got too close to spare fuel cells. It destroyed in the warehouse explosion. Mechanizer was later rebuilt and equipped with the Neo-Plutonium Armor. This time, it was destroyed by the Super Zeo Zords 1 and 2.
 Robocupid (voiced by Alex Borstein) – A robotic love-themed camera monster used by the Machine Empire. She specialized in the power to make humans develop obsessive attractions to nearby mechanical appliances. Even Robocupid is affected by her own powers as one of her beams reflects back at her and becomes attracted to Klank. It was destroyed by the Zeo Megazord.
 Defoliator (voiced by Richard Epcar) – A robotic heat-manipulating scorpion monster used by the Machine Empire. He made the weather scorching hot in Angel Grove by destroying plants to produce a greenhouse effect which even affected Lt. Stone's plants. It was destroyed by the Zeo Megazord. New plants were brought to Angel Grove to reverse the effects.
 Main Drain (voiced by Brad Orchard) – An energy-draining robotic construction-themed monster used by the Machine Empire. In battle, he shot his drain tubes underground and attached them to the Zeo Megazord. When Main Drain uses its energy-draining abilities, he can enhance his body into a stronger form. It was destroyed by the Red Battlezord.
 Punch-A-Bunch (voiced by Bob Papenbrook) – A robotic boxing monster used by the Machine Empire. It was destroyed by the Red Battlezord.
 Mace Face (voiced by Brad Orchard) – A spiked robot armadillo monster used by the Machine Empire. He had two forms: his regular spiked monster form and the form of a spiked ball. It was destroyed by the Zeo Mega Battlezord.
 Autochthon (voiced by Richard Epcar) – Autochthon (pronounced "Aw-Tock-thon") is an ancient evil silkworm spirit that was accidentally awakened by Tommy's brother David Trueheart and took on a robotic appearance. This was a blunder of the Machine Empire's behalf for choosing the cave to hold David captive. It was destroyed by the Zeo Mega Battlezord.
 Defector (voiced by Lex Lang) – A robotic monster created from the Machine Empire's scrap metal parts. His personality was controlled by a remote-control that was used by Klank. Defector posed as a traitor to the Royal House of Gadgetry as to earn the Rangers' trust and turn on them. As Rocky felt guilt over being tricked by Defector, he volunteered to use the Defender Wheel to destroy Defector.
 Drill Master (voiced by Dan Woren) -A robotic drill monster used by the Machine Empire. He first appeared in Adam's nightmare where Zordonicus had Tommy fight Drill Master alongside a Quadrafighter. It was destroyed by the Red Zeo Ranger. A second version was later equipped with the Neo-Plutonium Armor. It was destroyed by the Super Zeo Zord 4.
 Googleheimer the Toy Robot (voiced by Dave Mallow) – A robotic toy monster used by Prince Sprocket. It was destroyed by the Zeo Mega Battlezord.
 Wrecking Ball (voiced by Michael Sorich) – A robot wrecking ball monster controlled by Prince Sprocket. It was destroyed by the Red Battlezord.
 Admiral Abominator (voiced by Ezra Weisz) – A robotic admiral monster used by the Machine Empire. It wielded a sword and also had a bed of spikes built in underneath his coat. It was destroyed by the Zeo Mega Battlezord.
 Wolfbane (voiced by Steve Kramer) – A robotic goblin/wolf monster used by the Machine Empire. It was destroyed by the Pyramidas.
 Tarantabot (voiced by Steve McGowan) – A robotic tarantula monster used by the Machine Empire. It was destroyed by the Zeo Ultrazord.
 Somnibot (voiced by Barbara Goodson) – A robotic sleep-inducing sloth monster used by the Machine Empire. Beaten once, it assumed a stronger second form. It was destroyed by the Zeo Ultrazord.
 Varox – The Varox are a group of intergalactic robotic ivy-themed bounty hunters.
Borax (voiced by Bob Papenbrook) – A Varox that arrived on Earth when pursuing the Gold Ranger and became allied with King Mondo. He was destroyed by the Zeo Megazord.
 Silver Team Commander – A Varox that led his fellow Varox in chasing after the Gold Ranger and Pyramidas following Borax's destruction. When a Varox shot Pyramidas enough for it to crash into Aquitar, the Silver Team Commander declared their mission a success and left unaware that the Gold Ranger survived.
 Starboard Winger (voiced by Bob Papenbrook) – A Varox that partook in chasing after the Gold Ranger and Pyramidas following Borax's destruction. This version has rounder eye coverings and wears a scarf.
 Hosehead (voiced by Dave Mallow) – A robotic UFO-themed monster with tentacles used by the Machine Empire. It was among the Machine Empire monsters that were modified by the Neo-Plutonium Armor. It was destroyed by the Super Zeo Zord 3.
 Tough Tusks (voiced by Michael Sorich) – A robotic mammoth monster created by Louie Kaboom from Emily's elephant-head necklace. He shot a bluish-white energy beam from his forehead. It was destroyed by the Super Zeo Megazord.
 Midas Monster (voiced by Dave Mallow) – A robotic Golden Retriever monster used by Louie Kaboom. This monster first appeared in the form of a small dog statue known as the Midas Hound. It could transform ordinary items into gold, but soon began transforming things at random on its own. It was destroyed by the Zeo Ultrazord.
 Cruel Chrome (voiced by David Walsh) – A robotic hunter monster created by Prince Gasket from Detective Stone's wave runner. He was able to fire a hazardous water-like substance on the Rangers from a hose-like weapon. It was destroyed by the Super Zeo Ultrazord.
 Altor (voiced by Kirk Thornton) – A robotic Gold Ranger-themed monster used by Prince Gasket. It temporarily used Tommy's skills and strength. Altor faced off against Jason in the Machine Arena. It was destroyed by the Gold Ranger.
 Protectron (voiced by Richard Epcar) – A robotic monster used by Prince Gasket to guard the Chronosapios (a time-turning item that resembles a crystal ball). It was destroyed by the Super Zeo Megazord and the Warrior Wheel.
 Nuklifier (voiced by Kirk Thornton) – A robotic guardsman monster used by Prince Gasket. He wielded a spear and shot orange energy from it. He could also shoot this energy stream from a cannon in his forehead. It was destroyed by Auric the Conqueror.
 Mechaterpillar (voiced by Brianne Siddall) – A powerful robotic caterpillar monster created by Prince Gasket from Detective Stone's "Mechaterpillar 2000" fishing lure. It was able to separate itself into different parts. It was destroyed by the Pyramidas.
 Cog Changer (voiced by Michael Sorich) – Cog Changer was a cog-themed robot monster used by the Machine Empire to access the Zeo technology. He was capable of replacing the cogs on the Zeo Jet Cycles with evil ones that would cause the Rangers to lose control of the Bikes. After fusing with Impursonator, their composite monster form was destroyed by the Super Zeo Megazord and Warrior Wheel. He is voiced by Michael Sorich.
 Impursonator – Impursonator was a powerful purse monster accidentally created by Rita Repulsa from Katherine's ugly purse. Her rubbery skin made her nearly impervious to physical harm as the rapid-fire punches of the Red Battlezord only briefly stunned her. She could fire pink lightning bolts from her hands and had the ability to absorb the energy from any attack thrown at her. She could then use this energy to fire enhanced lightning blasts. It's only weakness was her distraction, evident when she ignored a direct order from Rita to remain in one of the Zeo Megazords and got called back for punishment. After fusing with Cog Changer, their composite monster form was destroyed by the Super Zeo Megazord and the Warrior Wheel. She is voiced by Wendee Lee.

Evil Space Aliens
 Lord Zedd The husband of Rita Repulsa. When the Machine Empire forced them off the Moon, Zedd worked to take revenge on the Machine Empire through whatever way possible. He is portrayed by Ed Neal and voiced by Robert Axelrod.
 Rita Repulsa A witch who became the wife of Lord Zedd. When the Machine Empire forced them off the moon, Rita worked to take revenge on the Machine Empire through whatever way possible. She is portrayed by Carla Perez and voiced by Barbara Goodson.
 Finster The leprechaun-themed henchman of Rita. After the Machine Empire forced Zedd and Rita off the Moon, Finster was among those who were evacuated. He later returned with Zedd and Rita in a plot to take revenge on the Machine Empire. He is voiced by Robert Axelrod.
 Goldar The manticore-themed minion of Rita Repulsa. He and Rito had amnesia following the Command Center's explosion and were roped into Bulk and Skull's plans until Lord Zedd restored their memories. He is voiced by Kerrigan Mahan.
 Rito Revolto The Gashadokuro/skeleton-themed brother of Rita. He is voiced by Bob Papenbrook.
 Squatt and Baboo Squatt is a hobgoblin-like minion of Rita and Baboo is a vampire-like minion of Rita. When the Machine Empire attacked Lord Zedd and Rita Repulsa's castle on the Moon, Squatt and Baboo were evacuated and remained with Master Vile while Lord Zedd and Rita Repulsa worked on ways to get revenge on the Machine Empire. They are voiced by Michael Sorich and Dave Mallow.
 Master Vile The father of Rita Repulsa and Rito Revolto. Rita Repulsa and Lord Zedd had to flee to Master Vile's world when the Machine Empire attacked. Master Vile considered the Machine Empire to be more evil than him as they destroy everything. He is voiced by Simon Prescott.
 Tengas The crow-like foot soldiers of Lord Zedd and Rita Repulsa.

Identity of the Gold Ranger
During the middle of the series, the identity of the Gold Ranger was a constant teaser and a central plot theme. After many episodes of speculation, with other characters like Billy Cranston, David Trueheart, and even Eugene Skullovitch suspected, it was revealed the Gold Ranger was Trey of Triforia, a new character. Former Red Ranger, Jason Lee Scott, obtained the powers of the Gold Ranger after Trey lost the ability to transform. Actor Brad Hawkins, who played Ryan Steele on VR Troopers, voiced the Gold Ranger early on. Saban had supposedly planned to use him after the end of VR Troopers as Ryan and put that series into the continuity of Power Rangers. However, for unknown reasons (believed to be scheduling conflicts), he was not used as the identity of the Gold Ranger, and instead Ted, Tim and Tom DiFilippo portrayed the three parts of Trey.

Episodes

Home media releases
Starting in August 1996, several episodes of Power Rangers Zeo were released on VHS.

In 2012, Shout Factory announced that it had reached an exclusive distribution deal with Saban for shows such as Power Rangers and Big Bad Beetleborgs. Power Rangers Zeo was released on DVD in August 2012, as part of a Time-Life exclusive boxed set containing seasons 1–7. The show later became available independently of the boxed set in two volumes, each containing 25 episodes, released November 12, 2013, and February 11, 2014.

Comics
Image Comics began publication of a Power Rangers Zeo comic in August 1996. It featured scripts by Tom and Mary Bierbaum, and art by Todd Nauck and Norm Rapmund. Four issues were drawn but only one was released before Image Comics lost the license.

Characters have been featured in Power Rangers comics published by Boom! Studios.

In 2018, the Zeo Rangers appeared in "Shattered Grid", a crossover event between teams from all eras commemorating the 25th anniversary of the original television series. It was published in Mighty Morphin Power Rangers #25-30 and various tie-ins. A Power Rangers Zeo story by Kyle Higgins and Marcus To was published in Mighty Morphin Power Rangers 2018 Annual as part of the crossover.

"Beyond the Grid," the follow up to "Shattered Grid", was published in Mighty Morphin Power Rangers #31-39. It saw Tanya joining a new team alongside the Ranger Slayer, the Magna Defender, Cameron, Andros and the Dark Ranger.

See also

 Chouriki Sentai Ohranger

References

External links
 
 Power Rangers Zeo at Fox Kids (Archive)
 

 
Zeo
Science fantasy television series
1990s American science fiction television series
1996 American television series debuts
1996 American television series endings
Television shows filmed in Santa Clarita, California
Television shows filmed in Los Angeles
Television shows set in California
English-language television shows
Television series by Saban Entertainment
Television series about size change
Television series about teenagers
1990s American high school television series
American children's action television series
American children's adventure television series
American children's fantasy television series
Fox Kids
Television shows adapted into comics
Television shows adapted into video games
Television series created by Haim Saban